Laura Bernal (born 27 January 1978) is a Paraguayan former professional tennis player.

Bernal represented the Paraguay Fed Cup team in a total of 20 ties from 1996 to 2001. She reached a best singles ranking of 478 on the professional tour, winning an ITF tournament in La Paz in 1998. As a doubles player, she won a further three ITF titles and was ranked as high as 287 in the world.

ITF finals

Singles (1–0)

Doubles (3–4)

References

External links
 
 
 

1978 births
Living people
Paraguayan female tennis players
20th-century Paraguayan women